Arvid Åberg (14 June 1885 – 8 November 1950) was a Swedish hammer thrower. He competed at the 1912 Summer Olympics and finished tenth. His daughter Majken became an Olympic discus thrower.

References

External links

1885 births
1950 deaths
Sportspeople from Linköping
Swedish male hammer throwers
Olympic athletes of Sweden
Athletes (track and field) at the 1912 Summer Olympics